The King (/O Vasilias) is a Greek drama film directed by Nikos Grammatikos. The film released in 2002 and stars Vangelis Mourikis, Marilita Lambropoulou and Minas Hatzisavvas. It won the Golden Piramide in 2003 Cairo International Film Festival as well as four awards in Greek State Film Awards.

Plot
A young man, recently released from prison, returns to his childhood hometown in order to escape from his recent criminal past. There, he is confronted with suspicion and hostility by local people, including the community leader. The only friendly person is the policeman. After his former girlfriend arrives, his past catches up with him and conflict with locals goes to extremes.

Cast
Vangelis Mourikis
Marilita Lambropoulou
Minas Hatzisavvas
Babis Giotopoulos
Vivi Koka
Tasos Nousias
Evangelia Andreadaki

Awards

References

External links

2002 films
2002 drama films
Greek drama films